Camptomastix hisbonalis is a moth in the family Crambidae. It was described by Francis Walker in 1859. It is found on Borneo and in China, Taiwan, Papua New Guinea and Australia, where it has been recorded from New South Wales.

References

Moths described in 1859
Spilomelinae